Amelia, formerly known as IPsoft, is an American technology company. It primarily focuses on artificial intelligence and cognitive and autonomic products for business. Its main products are Amelia, a conversational AI platform, and Amelia HyperAutomation Platform (formerly 1Desk), an autonomic framework for IT operations.

The company is headquartered in New York City and has offices in 13 countries.

History 
The company was founded as IPsoft, Inc., in New York City in 1998 by Chetan Dube, a former professor at New York University at the Courant Institute of Mathematical Sciences. The company rebranded to Amelia in October, 2020.

Products

Amelia 
Amelia is an AI-based digital assistant. The underlying technology is text-based, with text-to-speech capability. The avatar is based on Lauren Hayes, a professional model.

Amelia was first released in 2014. Version 3.0 was released on June 1st, 2017. By 2018, Amelia had been deployed in some capacity for customer care by about 25 companies, including SEB Group, and Accenture.

Amelia HyperAutomation Platform 

Released in 2017, Amelia HyperAutomation Platform (formerly 1Desk) is an enterprise-scale autonomic framework that integrates IT operations and shared services.
The platform integrates with Amelia to access the autonomic framework via a conversational interface.

Amelia HyperAutomation Platform features an integration framework to connect with any existing platform with an open API.
Its proprietary Machine Learning functionality (internally dubbed "IPconnect") recommends new automations based on observed behaviors of human workers.

IPcenter 
IPcenter, a predecessor of the Amelia HyperAutomation Platform, was an autonomic IT management platform that automated monitoring and remediation of network services. It was first released in 1999.
IPcenter contains a library of more than 20,000 automations routines for network management, which are branded as "virtual engineers".

References

External links
 

Software companies established in 1998
Technology companies established in 1998
Multinational companies headquartered in the United States
Privately held companies based in New York City